Jonathan Josué Paz Hernández (born 18 June 1995) is a Honduran professional footballer for Liga Nacional club Olimpia. He represented Honduras in the football competition at the 2016 Summer Olympics.

International career
He made his national team debut on 10 October 2020 in a friendly against Nicaragua. He scored a goal in a 1–1 home draw.

References

External links
 

Honduran footballers
1995 births
Living people
Footballers at the 2016 Summer Olympics
Olympic footballers of Honduras
People from Colón Department (Honduras)
Association football defenders
Honduras international footballers
C.D. Olimpia players